"Orally Fixated" is a song by Irish recording artist Róisín Murphy. Written by Murphy, Seiji (of Bugz in the Attic) and FunkinEven, the track was released as a digital single on 16 November 2009. On 12 November 2009, The Guardian offered a 48-hour free download of the single on its website.

Background
When asked about the inspiration behind "Orally Fixated" in an interview with Entertainment Weekly, Murphy said:

Critical reception
"Orally Fixated" received mixed reviews from music critics. Entertainment Weekly writer Joseph Brannigan Lynch noted that the song invokes "the vaguely industrial New Order/Depeche Mode vein of dance-pop", while adding that it "isn't as immediately grabbing as 'Let Me Know,' but Murphy is always at her best when straddling the line between moody electronics and dizzy disco choruses, which is exactly what 'Orally Fixated' does." In a review for Pitchfork Media, Eric Harvey wrote that Murphy and Seiji "try to simultaneously go globular and spare, Seiji filling any empty space with synth stabs and bite-size breakbeats. And, for some reason, a wanky guitar solo toward the end. The whole piece, like the ostensible double-entendre within it, feels strangely scattershot and unsatisfying, especially considering the great work they've done in the past." He also compared the song to Sheryl Lee Ralph's 1984 club hit "In the Evening".

Ben Baglin from FACT magazine felt that musically, the song "doesn't quite hang together. The stripped-down, sassy verses sound fantastic, Murphy's vampish delivery spot-on (hearing that voice is always a treat). But then there's a sudden and jarring shift in key for the chorus, which despite being damned catchy sounds likes it's been lifted from a completely different song and hastily pasted on." Luis Tovar of Pretty Much Amazing commented that the track "sounds like typical Roisin Murphy nosh—gritty, nostalgic, and sometimes underwhelming." Karen Mason of Shout4Music.com opined that "Murphy's seductive voice gives a warmth to the cold, electronic backing track but the arrangement makes it sound more like a remix than the proper version of the record. 'Orally Fixated' will be a Marmite record. Some people are going to love it for its originality but others are going to find it annoying, repetitive and strange."

Charts

References

2009 singles
Róisín Murphy songs
Songs written by Róisín Murphy
2009 songs

nl:You Know Me Better (lied)